Analiontas is a village in the Nicosia District of Cyprus, located south of Pera Orinis.

References

External links
 Official municipality website

Communities in Nicosia District